The North Midlands Cup is an annual rugby union knock-out cup club competition organised by the North Midlands Rugby Football Union and was first contested during the 1971-72 season with the inaugural cup being won by the now defunct Birmingham Police, who beat Evesham at the final held at The Reddings in Birmingham (formerly home of Moseley RFC).  It is currently open for clubs ranked in tier 5-6 of the English rugby union system that fall under the North Midlands RFU umbrella, including sides based in Birmingham and the West Midlands, Herefordshire, Shropshire and Worcestershire.  Originally the North Midlands Cup was the sole cup competition in the region but in 2001 and 2005, the North Midlands Shield and North Midlands Vase competitions were introduced for lower ranked clubs.  A further change in 2014 saw the introduction of a 'Plate' competition for sides eliminated in the early stages of the cup, although it was not played for during the 2018-19 competition.   

The current format is as a knock-out cup with a preliminary round, quarter-final, semi-final and final which is held at a neutral venue in March.  Due to the disjointed numbers of teams several teams have to play in the preliminary round.

North Midlands Cup winners

Number of wins

Cup
Stourbridge (7)
Dudley Kingswinford (5)
Luctonians (4)
Bromsgrove (3)
Old Dixonians (3)
Hereford (3)
Newport (Salop) (3)
Worcester (3)
Aston Old Edwardians (2)
Birmingham & Solihull (2)
Bournville (2)
Camp Hill (2)
Whitchurch (2)
Birmingham City Police (1)
Bridgnorth (1)
Evesham (1)
Malvern (1)
Old Edwardians (1)
Old Halesonians (1)
Solihull (1)

Plate
Bridgnorth (2)
Bromsgrove (1)
Whitchurch (1)

Notes

See also
 North Midlands RFU
 North Midlands Shield
 North Midlands Vase
 English rugby union system
 Rugby union in England

References

External links
 North Midlands RFU

Recurring sporting events established in 1971
Rugby union cup competitions in England